Bianzone is a comune (municipality) in the Province of Sondrio in the Italian region Lombardy, located about  northeast of Milan and about  east of Sondrio, on the border with Switzerland.

The municipality of Bianzone contains the frazioni (subdivisions, mainly villages and hamlets) Bratta, Piazzeda, Campei, Campione, and Nemina.

Bianzone borders the following municipalities: Brusio (Switzerland), Teglio, Villa di Tirano.

Demographic evolution

References

Cities and towns in Lombardy